Nannygai is the name of various fish from the Australian region:

 In family Lutjanidae:
 Malabar blood snapper, Lutjanus malabaricus.
 Crimson snapper, Lutjanus erythropterus.
 In family Berycidae:
 Eastern nannygai, Centroberyx affinis.
 Yelloweye nannygai, Centroberyx australis.
 Family Glaucosomatidae:
 Pearl perch, Glaucosoma scapulare.